The Central Florida Jaguars, commonly known as the Jags, were a professional indoor football team based in Lakeland, Florida.

The Jags were the third indoor football team to call Lakeland home; the first team was the Lakeland Thunderbolts which played in the National Indoor Football League from 2005 until 2006 and later the American Indoor Football Association in 2007 (where they won the AIFA Championship Bowl that year before folding).  After that, the Lakeland Raiders would play in the Ultimate Indoor Football League from 2012 until 2013, after which they would later join X-League Indoor Football and change their name to the Florida Marine Raiders, playing in the 2014 and 2015 seasons before the league's folding

History
The Jaguars joined American Indoor Football (AIF) before the beginning of the 2016 season and played their home games at the Lakeland Center.  Their logo and colors were somewhat similar to the NFL's Jacksonville Jaguars.  Following the 2016 season, the AIF ceased operations, leaving the Jaguars without a league. In October 2016, they became the charter member of the Elite Indoor Football Conference for the 2017 season. However, with the instability of the new league, they were removed from their home arena in 2017. All Elite Indoor Football Conference games were then announced to be played outdoors at Bartow Park in Bartow, Florida. The league and the Jags appear to have ceased operations during the 2017 season and all websites have lapsed.

Final AIF roster

Staff

Statistics and records

Season-by-season results

Head coaches' records

2016 season

Key:

Exhibition
All start times are local to home team

Regular season
All start times are local to home team

Standings

References

External links
Central Florida Jaguars official website
American Indoor Football official website

Former American Indoor Football teams
American football teams in Florida
Sports in Lakeland, Florida
American football teams established in 2015
2015 establishments in Florida
Sports in Polk County, Florida